Portuguese immigration to Hawaii began in 1878 when laborers from Madeira and the Azores migrated there to work in the sugarcane plantations. By the end of 1911, nearly 16,000 Portuguese immigrants had arrived.

Early immigration

The Hawaiian census of 1878 showed that only 438 residents out of 57,985 people were Portuguese, less than 0.8% of the population. Most of these Portuguese residents had been born either in the Azores or Madeira Islands, and nearly all had arrived as sailors on whaling ships. Although a few brought their wives or were joined by them later, women made up only about one-eighth of this tiny immigrant community. Despite the fact that so few Portuguese had made their way to the Hawaiian Islands prior to 1878, those that did found opportunity and tended to stay.

Conditions in Hawaii in 1878 were conducive to immigration. King Kalākaua, who had recently ascended the Hawaiian throne, encouraged closer ties with Europe, and a growing Hawaiian economy, due largely to increased sugar exports to California, created a demand for laborers to work the sugarcane plantations. Because the native Hawaiian workers had been decimated by disease, there were not enough laborers to supply the sugarcane plantations. In 1852, Hawaii began importing Chinese workers. So many Chinese were brought in that, by 1878, they made up nearly 10% of the population. Although Chinese immigrants worked hard, they were accused of gambling, prostitution, and opium use. A search for alternate sources of labor led both the Hawaiian government and the plantation owners to offer incentives and concessions not given the Chinese nor other Asian ethnic groups, to attract immigrants of European descent willing to work in the cane fields.

Immigration of 1878 to 1911

Jason Perry (Jacinto Pereira), a Portuguese settler who served as the Portuguese Consul to Hawaii, suggested in 1876 to plantation owners of the Planters' Society (a predecessor of the Hawaiian Sugar Planters' Association) that the Madeira and Azores Islands of Portugal might be ideal sources of reliable workers. Portuguese colonists had first settled these islands in the Middle Ages, and the terrain and subtropical climate were very similar to that of the Hawaiian Islands. Most importantly though, sugarcane had been the mainstay of the economy in Madeira and the Azores for over 400 years and most of the population was involved in one way or another in the sugarcane industry.

Intrigued by Perry's suggestion, the Planters' Society began recruiting Portuguese contract workers, first in 1878 from the Madeira Islands, then two years later from the Azores as well. Several ships between 1878 and 1887 brought to Hawaii more than 3,300 Portuguese men from these islands, but because many of the men brought their wives, children, and other relatives as well, there was an actual immigration during these years of about 10,700 Portuguese. Whereas contracts for the Chinese workers that preceded them generally stipulated single men only, the Portuguese were allowed to bring their families, an incentive that the plantation owners hoped would provide stability. Prior to independence in 1975, many Cape Verdeans emigrated to Hawaii from drought-stricken Portuguese Cape Verde, an overseas province of Portugal. Because these people arrived using their Portuguese passports, they were registered as Portuguese immigrants by the Hawaiian (and later, the American) authorities.

Portuguese immigration to the islands slowed after 1887, which was the same year that King Kalākaua was stripped of power, and about the same time that importation of other ethnic groups increased. Nonetheless, Portuguese immigration continued, and by the end of 1911 almost 16,000 Portuguese had arrived. Unfortunately, the more affluent members of Hawaiian society tended to view these newcomers as inferior or "low class". Growing resentment at being treated as "second-class citizens" resulted in many Portuguese later emigrating to the mainland United States, particularly California, in search of equality and opportunity. Though many left, many stayed and, by 1910, Portuguese residents made up 11.6% of the population of Hawaii.

Immigrant culture and traditions

Native Hawaiian speakers called the Portuguese immigrants who came to their country "Pukikī." These newcomers were devout followers of the Roman Catholic faith with strong family ties. Most were short, with slender builds, and dark skin from long hours of working under the sun in the cane fields. Many of Cape Verdean or other mixed African heritage were in fact so dark that their race on some of the early U.S. census returns were listed as black, which contributed to prejudice against them. Because few of these immigrants could read or write, they had strong oral traditions and they retained much of the culture and traditions brought with them.

One popular Portuguese tradition in Hawaii today is the making of malasadas, which are deep-fried pastries similar to the beignet of New Orleans, that traditionally have no holes or fillings but coated in granulated cane sugar. They were first made by Hawaiian residents from the Madeira and Azores Islands, who would use up butter and sugar prior to Lent by cooking malasadas. These pastries are an important part in Madeira and the Azores of the "Terça-feira Gorda", a festival also known as the Carnaval that is the same holiday as "Fat Tuesday" or "Mardi Gras" elsewhere. In Hawaii the day is called "Malasada Day" and it dates back to the time of the 19th-century sugarcane plantations.

Another popular Portuguese tradition in Hawaii is the Holy Spirit Festival (Festa do Espírito Santo), which, since 1901, is celebrated each May with a parade and feast. This three-day event is not an official church holiday, but a traditional observance that began in the 18th century with the Cult of the Holy Spirit in the Azores. It usually starts on a Friday night, followed on Saturday by decorating religious statues for the festivities to follow. Then on Sunday a young woman is chosen as Queen Isabel  the 6th queen of Portugal, and she and her court lead a colorful parade. The final event is a mass with a "Blessing of the meat and bread" by a priest, after which Isabel is crowned as the Holy Ghost Queen. A feast is then held in "a tradition of charity and feeding the poor," where food is served to all present. The foods of this feast typically include malasadas (pastries), paodoce (sweet bread), bean soup, Portuguese sausages, and bowls of beef and fish marinated in wine.

The best-known Portuguese contribution to Hawaiian culture is the ukulele, based on the traditional Portuguese braguinha (cavaquinho). The introduction of the ukulele is generally credited to Madeiran cabinet makers Manuel Nunes, Augusto Dias, and José do Espírito Santo, who came to the Islands in 1879 on the British clipper SS Ravenscrag. The Hawaiian Gazette in late August 1879, two weeks after the arrival of the Ravenscrag, reported that "Madeira Islanders recently arrived here have been delighting the people with nightly street concerts." The article then mentions "their strange instruments, which are a kind of cross between a guitar and banjo."

Migrating to Hawaii

At least 24 different ships from 1878 to 1911 brought almost 16,000 Portuguese immigrants to Hawaii. Although mainly from Madeira and the Azores, there were also contingents from the eastern United States, mainland Portugal, and from the Portuguese community of Montevideo, Uruguay. Although conditions onboard these ships from 1882 on improved dramatically, as most immigrants by then came by steamship, the first arrivals to Hawaii from Madeira and the Azores spent up to three months at sea in cramped quarters on sailing ships. Strong currents crossing the Atlantic and rough seas when coming around Cape Horn at the tip of South America made for a perilous voyage. When the SS Ravenscrag reached port with its load of immigrants in 1879 after 123 days at sea, three children had perished during the voyage. Even three years later when the first group of immigrants to reach Hawaii by steamship arrived in 1882 on the SS Monarch after 57 days at sea, 13 children had died on the voyage.

Hawaiians of Portuguese descent

Although Portuguese sailors probably visited Hawaii as early as 1794, the earliest Portuguese immigrant of whom there is official record, and the first Portuguese immigrant of note, was Dr. João (John) Elliott de Castro, who arrived in 1814 and became the personal physician, and retainer of King Kamehameha I. Since Castro's day there have been many Portuguese-Hawaiians of note, some of whom are listed below.

 Stephen Peter Alencastre (1876–1940), Catholic Bishop of Hawaii.
John Gaspar Machado (1846–1937) Constructed Hawaii’s first formidable coffee mill in 1880 by Napo‘Opo‘O, Honaunau-Napoopoo, Hi near Kealakekua Bay on the Big Island near the Kona coffee growing region. 
 Bryan Baptiste (1955–2008), Former Mayor of the County of Kauai.
 Brennen Carvalho (born 1985), football player
 Bernard Carvalho (born 1961), Former Mayor of the County of Kauai, former pro football player for the Miami Dolphins.
 Auliʻi Cravalho (born 2000), actress known for her role in the Disney Film Moana.
 Wesley Correira (born 1978), professional mixed martial arts fighter. 
 Frank De Lima (born 1949), comedian.
 Frank Ferera (1885–1951), ukulele and Hawaiian steel guitar player.
 Sid Fernandez, (born 1962), professional baseball player.
 Kurt Gouveia (born 1964), professional football player.
 Manuel Henriques (1888–1974), former Vice Speaker of the territorial/state House of Representatives.
 Billy Martin, (1928–1989), baseball manager. Though born in California, his father came to Hawaii from the Azores.
 Glenn Medeiros (born 1970), singer and songwriter.
 Leroy A. Mendonca (1932–1951), posthumous Korean War recipient of the Medal of Honor.
 Ernest Morgado (1917–2002), businessman, created huli-huli chicken.
 Manuel Nunes (1843–1922), ukulele maker, and self-proclaimed inventor of the ukulele.
 Prince Oana (1910–1976), professional baseball player.
 Bobo Olson (1928–2002), professional boxer
 Jonah Ray  (born 1982), comedian. 
 Clarence Richard Silva (born 1949), Catholic Bishop of Honolulu.
 Freddie Tavares (1913–1990), designer of the Fender Stratocaster.
 Kanekoa Texeira (born 1986), former professional baseball player and coach.
 Shane Victorino (born 1980), professional baseball player.

See also

 Asian immigration to Hawaii
 Chinese immigration to Hawaii
 Europeans in Oceania
 Greeks in Hawaii
 Japanese in Hawaii
 Korean immigration to Hawaii
 Portuguese Americans
 Puerto Rican immigration to Hawaii
 Spanish immigration to Hawaii

References

Further reading

External links

 

 
History of Hawaii
History of immigration to Hawaii
Ethnic groups in Hawaii
Hawaii